Port Alberni/Sproat Lake Water Aerodrome  is located adjacent to Port Alberni, British Columbia, Canada.

See also
 List of airports on Vancouver Island

References

Seaplane bases in British Columbia
Port Alberni
Registered aerodromes in British Columbia